Heaven Sent is a song recorded by American singer Keyshia Cole. It was written by Cole, Jason Farmer, Alex Francis, and Lamont Wilson for her second studio album Just like You (2007), while production was overseen by Francis and Farmer with additional credit by Ron Fair. The ballad was released as the album's fourth and final single in March 2008. "Heaven Sent" became cole's third chart topper on the US Hot R&B/Hip-Hop Songs and earned two Grammy Award nominations for Best Female R&B Vocal Performance and Best R&B Song. An accompanying music video was shot in Hawaii and is based on the poem "Footprints."

Background
"Heaven Sent" was written by Cole, Jason Farmer, Alex Francis, and Lamont Wilson. The lyrics of the ballad were inspired by Cole's cousin.

Chart performance
The song became Cole's third number one on the US Billboard Hot R&B/Hip-Hop Songs chart. "Heaven Sent"  remained nine consecutive weeks atop the chart. The song also peaked at number 28 on the US Billboard Hot 100. Billboard ranked the song fourth on its Hot R&B/Hip-Hop Songs year-end chart in 2008.

Music video

Cole consulted frequent collaborator, director Benny Boom, to film a music video for "Heaven Sent." The visuals were filmed on March 4, 2008 in Oahu, Hawaii and features Cole singing alone on a beach and in a jungle by a waterfall. Also seen are panoramic shots of a farm with horses and a barn. Cole cited the  allegorical religious poem "Footprints in the Sand" as an inspiration for the clip. "Heaven Sent" premiered on March 19, 2008, on Yahoo! Music and BET's Access Granted. It peaked at number one on May 8, 2008 on  106 & Park.

Credits and personnel 
Credits adapted from the liner notes of Just like You.

Keyshia Cole – vocals, writer
Dru Castro – recording engineer
 Torrance Esmond – assistant recording engineer
Ron Fair – arranger, additional producer
Jason Farmer – producer, writer
Alex Francis – producer, writer
Tal Herzberg – engineer
Peter Mokran – mixing engineer
Eric Weaver – assistant mixing engineer
Lamont Wilson – writer

Charts

Weekly charts

Year-end charts

See also
List of number-one R&B singles of 2008 (U.S.)

References

2008 singles
Keyshia Cole songs
Music videos directed by Benny Boom
Songs written by Keyshia Cole
Contemporary R&B ballads
2007 songs
Geffen Records singles
2000s ballads